Momodou Sarr (born 10 December 1959) is a Gambian sprinter. He competed in the 4 × 100 metres relay at the 1992 Summer Olympics and the 1996 Summer Olympics.

References

External links
 

1959 births
Living people
Athletes (track and field) at the 1992 Summer Olympics
Athletes (track and field) at the 1996 Summer Olympics
Gambian male sprinters
Olympic athletes of the Gambia
Place of birth missing (living people)